Ludwigia hirtella, commonly called spindleroot, is a species of plant in the evening primrose family that is native to the south-central United States of America.

References

Flora of North America
hirtella
Taxa named by Constantine Samuel Rafinesque